The Shire of Birchip was a local government area about  northwest of Bendigo, in northwestern Victoria, Australia.

History

Birchip was first incorporated as a shire on 6 April 1895. It was originally gazetted as the Shire of Wirmbirchip, with the error being fixed on 8 November 1895. On 22 May 1896, it annexed parts of the Shire of Borung.

On 20 January 1995, the Shire of Birchip was abolished, and along with the Shires of Charlton, Donald and Wycheproof, and parts of the Shire of Kara Kara, was merged into the newly created Shire of Buloke.

Wards

The Shire of Birchip was divided into three ridings on 31 May 1988, each of which elected three councillors:
 North Riding
 South Riding
 West Riding

Towns and localities
 Ballapur
 Birchip*
 Curyo
 Jil Jil
 Karyrie
 Kinnabulla
 Lake Tchum
 Morton Plains
 Reedy Dam
 Warmur
 Watchupga
 Whirily
 Wilkur South

* Council seat.

Population

* Estimate in the 1958 Victorian Year Book.

References

External links
 Victorian Places - Birchip and Birchip Shire

Birchip